Félix Eboa Eboa (born 19 April 1997) is a Cameroonian professional footballer who plays as a defender for Ligue 2 club Guingamp.

Club career
On 22 June 2017, Eboa Eboa signed his first professional contract with Guingamp.

In August 2020, he suffered a "nightmare" injury that ruled him out for the entirety of the 2020–21 season.

International career
As of October 2015, Eboa has made his debut for Cameroon national team.

References

External links
 

1997 births
Living people
Association football midfielders
Cameroonian footballers
Cameroon international footballers
Cameroonian expatriate footballers
Ligue 1 players
Paris Saint-Germain F.C. players
En Avant Guingamp players
Expatriate footballers in France